In enzymology, an aldehyde dehydrogenase [NAD(P)+] is an enzyme that catalyzes the chemical reaction

an aldehyde + NAD(P)+ + H2O  an acid + NAD(P)H + H+

The 4 substrates of this enzyme are aldehyde, NAD+, NADP+, and H2O, whereas its 4 products are acid, NADH, NADPH, and H+.

This enzyme belongs to the family of oxidoreductases, specifically those acting on the aldehyde or oxo group of donor with NAD+ or NADP+ as acceptor.  The systematic name of this enzyme class is aldehyde:NAD(P)+ oxidoreductase. Other names in common use include aldehyde dehydrogenase [NAD(P)+], and ALDH.  This enzyme participates in 5 metabolic pathways: glycolysis / gluconeogenesis, histidine metabolism, tyrosine metabolism, phenylalanine metabolism, and metabolism of xenobiotics by cytochrome p450.

Structural studies

References

 
 Boyer, P.D., Lardy, H. and Myrback, K. (Eds.), The Enzymes, 2nd ed., vol. 7, Academic Press, New York, 1963, p. 203-221.
 
 
 

EC 1.2.1
NADPH-dependent enzymes
NADH-dependent enzymes
Enzymes of known structure